Ivona Jerković (born July 2, 1984 in Belgrade, SFR Yugoslavia) is a Serbian women's basketball player. She plays for ŽKK Partizan in Serbia. She also played for Fenerbahçe İstanbul and Migrosspor in Turkey. She is 200 cm and plays center position. With ŽKK Partizan she won national Championship (2009–10).

Achievements
EuroCup Women - runner-up in 2004 with Fenerbahçe İstanbul

References

External links
Profile at eurobasket.com

1984 births
Living people
Basketball players from Belgrade
Fenerbahçe women's basketball players
Migrosspor basketball players
ŽKK Partizan players
Centers (basketball)
Serbian women's basketball players
ŽKK Crvena zvezda players